Silver Run may refer to:

 Silver Run (Delaware Bay tributary), in Delaware
 Silver Run, Carroll County, Maryland, an unincorporated community
 Silver Run, Wicomico County, Maryland, an unincorporated community
 Silver Run, Mississippi, an unincorporated community
 Silver Run, Ohio, an unincorporated community
 Silver Run (North Fork Hughes River), a stream in West Virginia